In continuum mechanics,  plate theories are mathematical descriptions of the mechanics of flat plates that draw on the theory of beams.  Plates are defined as plane structural elements with a small thickness compared to the planar dimensions.  The typical thickness to width ratio of a plate structure is less than 0.1.  A plate theory takes advantage of this disparity in length scale to reduce the full three-dimensional solid mechanics problem to a two-dimensional problem.  The aim of plate theory is to calculate the deformation and stresses in a plate subjected to loads.

Of the numerous plate theories that have been developed since the late 19th century, two are widely accepted and used in engineering. These are
 the Kirchhoff–Love theory of plates (classical plate theory)
 The Uflyand-Mindlin theory of plates (first-order shear plate theory)

Kirchhoff–Love theory for thin plates 

The Kirchhoff–Love theory is an extension of Euler–Bernoulli beam theory to thin plates. The theory was developed in 1888 by Love using assumptions proposed by Kirchhoff. It is assumed that a mid-surface plane can be used to represent the three-dimensional plate in two-dimensional form.

The following kinematic assumptions are made in this theory:
 straight lines normal to the mid-surface remain straight after deformation
 straight lines normal to the mid-surface remain normal to the mid-surface after deformation
 the thickness of the plate does not change during a deformation.

Displacement field 
The Kirchhoff hypothesis implies that the displacement field has the form

If  are the angles of rotation of the normal to the mid-surface, then in the Kirchhoff–Love theory

Strain-displacement relations 
For the situation where the strains in the plate are infinitesimal and the rotations of the mid-surface normals are less than 10° the strains-displacement relations are

Therefore, the only non-zero strains are in the in-plane directions.

If the rotations of the normals to the mid-surface are in the range of 10° to 15°, the strain-displacement relations can be approximated using the von Kármán strains.  Then the kinematic assumptions of Kirchhoff-Love theory lead to the following strain-displacement relations

This theory is nonlinear because of the quadratic terms in the strain-displacement relations.

Equilibrium equations 
The equilibrium equations for the plate can be derived from the principle of virtual work.  For the situation where the strains and rotations of the plate are small, the equilibrium equations for an unloaded plate are given by

where the stress resultants and stress moment resultants are defined as

The quantities  are the stresses.

If the plate is loaded by an external distributed load  that is normal to the mid-surface and directed in the positive  direction, the principle of virtual work then leads to the equilibrium equations

For moderate rotations, the strain-displacement relations take the von Karman form and the equilibrium equations can be expressed as

Boundary conditions 
The boundary conditions that are needed to solve the equilibrium equations of plate theory can be obtained from the boundary terms in the principle of virtual work.

For small strains and small rotations, the boundary conditions are

Note that the quantity  is an effective shear force.

Stress–strain relations 
The stress–strain relations for a linear elastic Kirchhoff plate are given by

Since  and  do not appear in the equilibrium equations it is implicitly assumed that these quantities do not have any effect on the momentum balance and are neglected.

It is more convenient to work with the stress and moment resultants that enter the equilibrium equations.  These are related to the displacements by

and

The  extensional stiffnesses are the quantities

The  bending stiffnesses (also called flexural rigidity) are the quantities

Isotropic and homogeneous Kirchhoff plate 

For an isotropic and  homogeneous plate, the stress–strain relations are

The moments corresponding to these stresses are

Pure bending 
For an isotropic, homogeneous plate under pure bending the governing equation is

In index notation,

In direct tensor notation, the governing equation is

Transverse loading 
For a transversely loaded plate without axial deformations, the governing equation has the form

where

In index notation,

and in direct notation

In cylindrical coordinates , the governing equation is

Orthotropic and homogeneous Kirchhoff plate 
For an orthotropic plate

Therefore,

and

Transverse loading 

where

Dynamics of thin Kirchhoff plates 

The dynamic theory of plates determines the propagation of waves in the plates, and the study of standing waves and vibration modes.

Governing equations 
The governing equations for the dynamics of a Kirchhoff–Love plate are

where, for a plate with density ,

and

The figures below show some vibrational modes of a circular plate.

Isotropic plates 
The governing equations simplify considerably for isotropic and homogeneous plates for which the in-plane deformations can be neglected and have the form

where  is the bending stiffness of the plate.  For a uniform plate of thickness ,

In direct notation

Uflyand-Mindlin theory for thick plates 

In the theory of thick plates, or theory of Yakov S. Uflyand (see, for details, Elishakoff's handbook), Raymond Mindlin and Eric Reissner, the normal to the mid-surface remains straight but not necessarily perpendicular to the mid-surface.  If  and  designate the angles which the mid-surface makes with the  axis then

Then the Mindlin–Reissner hypothesis implies that

Strain-displacement relations 
Depending on the amount of rotation of the plate normals two different approximations for the strains can be derived from the basic kinematic assumptions.

For small strains and small rotations the strain-displacement relations for Mindlin–Reissner plates are

The shear strain, and hence the shear stress, across the thickness of the plate is not neglected in this theory.  However, the shear strain is constant across the thickness of the plate.  This cannot be accurate since the shear stress is known to be parabolic even for simple plate geometries.  To account for the inaccuracy in the shear strain, a shear correction factor is applied so that the correct amount of internal energy is predicted by the theory.  Then

Equilibrium equations 
The equilibrium equations have slightly different forms depending on the amount of bending expected in the plate.  For the situation where the strains and rotations of the plate are small the equilibrium equations for a Mindlin–Reissner plate are

The resultant shear forces in the above equations are defined as

Boundary conditions 
The boundary conditions are indicated by the boundary terms in the principle of virtual work.

If the only external force is a vertical force on the top surface of the plate, the boundary conditions are

Constitutive relations 
The stress–strain relations for a linear elastic Mindlin–Reissner plate are given by

Since  does not appear in the equilibrium equations it is implicitly assumed that it do not have any effect on the momentum balance and is neglected.  This assumption is also called the plane stress assumption.  The remaining stress–strain relations for an orthotropic material, in matrix form, can be written as

Then,

and

For the shear terms

The  extensional stiffnesses are the quantities

The  bending stiffnesses are the quantities

Isotropic and homogeneous Uflyand-Mindlin plates 

For uniformly thick, homogeneous, and isotropic plates, the stress–strain relations in the plane of the plate are

The through-the-thickness shear stresses and strains are related by

where  is the shear modulus.

Constitutive relations 
The relations between the stress resultants and the generalized displacements for an isotropic Mindlin–Reissner plate are:

and

The bending rigidity is defined as the quantity

For a plate of thickness , the bending rigidity has the form

where

Governing equations 
If we ignore the in-plane extension of the plate, the governing equations are

In terms of the generalized deformations , the three governing equations are

The boundary conditions along the edges of a rectangular plate are

Reissner–Stein static theory for isotropic cantilever plates 
In general, exact solutions for cantilever plates using plate theory are quite involved and few exact solutions can be found in the literature.  Reissner and Stein provide a simplified theory for cantilever plates that is an improvement over older theories such as Saint-Venant plate theory.

The Reissner-Stein theory assumes a transverse displacement field of the form

The governing equations for the plate then reduce to two coupled ordinary differential equations:

where

At , since the beam is clamped, the boundary conditions are

where

{| class="toccolours collapsible collapsed" width="60%" style="text-align:left"
!Derivation of Reissner–Stein cantilever plate equations
|-
|The strain energy of bending of a thin rectangular plate of uniform thickness  is given by

where  is the transverse displacement,  is the length,  is the width,  is the Poisson's
ratio,  is the Young's modulus, and

The potential energy of transverse loads  (per unit length) is

The potential energy of in-plane loads  (per unit width) is

The potential energy of tip forces  (per unit width), and bending moments  and 
(per unit width) is

A balance of energy requires that the total energy is

With the Reissener–Stein assumption for the displacement, we have

and

setting it to zero gives us the Euler equations

and

where

The boundary conditions at  can be found by integration by parts:

where

|}

See also 
 Bending of plates
 Vibration of plates
 Infinitesimal strain theory
 Membrane theory of shells
Finite strain theory
Stress (mechanics)
Stress resultants
Linear elasticity
Bending
Föppl–von Kármán equations
Euler–Bernoulli beam equation
Timoshenko beam theory

References 

Continuum mechanics